Anantapur railway station (station code:ATP) is located in Anantapur district in the Indian state of Andhra Pradesh and serves Anantapur city. It lies on Guntakal–Bangalore section.

History 

The Guntakal–Bangalore line was opened in 1892–93. The metre-gauge Guntakal–Mysore Frontier Railway was opened in 1893. It was operated by Southern Mahrata Railway.

Electrification 
The Gooty-Bangalore railway line was fully electrified and commissioned on 14 July 2016.

Classification 
Anantapur is classified as an NSG-3 station in the Guntakal railway division. Anantapur has been selected for the Adarsh Station Scheme, a scheme for upgradation of stations by the Indian Railways.

Amenities 
 Anantapur railway station has computerized reservation counters, waiting room, retiring room, non-vegetarian refreshment stall, light refreshment stall, tea stall and book stall.
 Anantapuram has 4 platforms and each can handle a train with more than 21 coaches. Daily 41 pairs of passenger trains pass through this station with halt times more than 2 minutes.

References

External links 

Railway stations in Anantapur district
Guntakal railway division
Railway stations opened in 1872